Michael Joseph "Mike" Forgeron (born 24 January 1966, in Main-à-Dieu, Nova Scotia) is a rower from Canada. He competed at two consecutive Summer Olympics, starting in 1992. At his debut, he was a member of the team that won the gold medal in the Men's Eights (3 seat) making Forgeron the first Olympic Gold Medalist in Atlantic Canada. In the 1996 Olympics, he competed in the Men's Double Sculls. Forgeron was also in the Pan Am Games in a coxed pair straight six (stroke) winning a bronze medal along with a pair winning a silver medal.

External links
 
 
 

1966 births
Living people
Canadian male rowers
Olympic rowers of Canada
Rowers at the 1992 Summer Olympics
Rowers at the 1996 Summer Olympics
Sportspeople from Nova Scotia
Olympic gold medalists for Canada
Olympic medalists in rowing
Medalists at the 1992 Summer Olympics
Pan American Games medalists in rowing
Pan American Games silver medalists for Canada
Rowers at the 1991 Pan American Games